Rillton is an unincorporated community in Westmoreland County, Pennsylvania, United States. Rillton has a post office, with ZIP code 15678.

Demographics

The population of Rillton (zip 15678) is 549. The population density is 958 inhabitants per square kilometer. The median age at Rillton (zip 15678) is 33.8 years, the American median age is 37.4 years. The number of people per household in Rillton (zip 15678) is 2.1, the American average of people per household is 2.6.

Notable person
Pete Marcus, American football player.

References

Unincorporated communities in Westmoreland County, Pennsylvania
Unincorporated communities in Pennsylvania